The 1980 Centennial Cup is the tenth Tier II Junior "A" 1980 ice hockey National Championship for the Canadian Junior A Hockey League.

The Centennial Cup was competed for by the winners of the Abbott Cup, Dudley Hewitt Cup, and the Callaghan Cup.

The tournament was hosted by the North York Rangers  in the city of North York, Ontario.

The Playoffs

Round Robin

Results
Sherwood-Parkdale Metros defeated North York Rangers 7-6 2OT
North York Rangers defeated Red Deer Rustlers 2-0
Red Deer Rustlers  defeated Sherwood-Parkdale Metros 6-0
North York Rangers defeated Sherwood-Parkdale Metros 4-3
Red Deer Rustlers defeated North York Rangers 5-4 2OT
Red Deer Rustlers defeated Sherwood-Parkdale Metros 7-6 2OT

Note: OT - denotes overtime

Finals

Awards
Most Valuable Player: Brent Sutter (Red Deer Rustlers)
Top Scorer: Bill Colville (North York Rangers)
Most Sportsmanlike Player: Doug Rigler (Red Deer Rustlers)

All-Star Team
Forward
Bill Colville (North York Rangers)
Doug Rigler (Red Deer Rustlers)
Paul Bernard (Sherwood-Parkdale Metros)
Defence
Jim File (North York Rangers)
Jeff Woollacott (North York Rangers)
Goal
Brian Ford (Red Deer Rustlers)

Roll of League Champions
AJHL: Red Deer Rustlers
BCJHL: Penticton Knights
CJHL: Hawkesbury Hawks
IJHL: Sherwood-Parkdale Metros
MJHL: Selkirk Steelers
MVJHL: Cole Harbour Colts
NBJHL:
NOJHL: Onaping Falls Huskies
OPJHL: North York Rangers
QJAHL:
SJHL: Prince Albert Raiders

See also
Canadian Junior A Hockey League
Royal Bank Cup
Anavet Cup
Doyle Cup
Dudley Hewitt Cup
Fred Page Cup
Abbott Cup
Mowat Cup

External links
Royal Bank Cup Website

1990
Cup